Franz Xaver Niemetschek (24 July 1766 – 19 March 1849) was a Czech philosopher, teacher and music critic. He wrote the first full-length biography of Wolfgang Amadeus Mozart which has remained an important source of information about the composer.

Life

Born in Sadská, Bohemia, Niemetschek came from a large, musical family. He received his schooling in Prague at the Gymnasium and read philosophy at the university. He taught poetry and Latin at the Gymnasiums in Pilsen and started a music publishing business. In 1800 he was awarded a doctorate and in 1802 he became professor at Prague University, lecturing on logic, ethics and pedagogy. The composer Jan Václav Voříšek was one of his pupils. He was made a freeman of Pilsen and Prague for his many valuable contributions to the arts, e.g. as director of the institute for the deaf and dumb. He wrote books on music history. He lived near the residence of Josepha Duschekova in the Liechtenstein Palace in the Lesser Quarters of Prague, and was a frequent visitor at the musical gatherings in Bertramka. In 1820 he retired to Vienna after disagreements with the university authorities.

Niemetschek was one of the first music critics in Prague. He saw the Singspiel as the principal factor in the decline of musical standards in the city.

Niemetschek died in Vienna at the age of 82 and is buried in St. Marx Cemetery. Unfortunately his estate, which contained many valuable documents, is now lost.

Mozart biography

Mozart's widow Constanze made many documents available to him for his research. His book Leben des k.k. Kapellmeisters Wolfgang Gottlieb Mozart was published in 1798. Later, in 1808, it was published in an altered form with the title Lebensbeschreibung des k.k. Kapellmeisters Wolfgang Amadeus Mozart. Niemetschek claimed to have had a long association with Mozart, but the lack of direct quotations or citings of personal conversations leads some scholars to doubt his claims. However, he welcomed Mozart's two surviving sons, Karl and Wolfgang Jr., into his home in the Lesser Quarter and became a foster father figure to them.

As the biography makes clear, Niemetschek was very proud of his Czech nationality, and he strongly emphasizes the warm reception that Mozart received during his visits to Prague. See Mozart and Prague.

Based on research by Austrian scholar , severe doubt has recently been cast on the veracity of Niemetschek's claim that he actually made Mozart's personal acquaintance.

Notes

References
 Grove Dictionary of Music and Musicians, edited by Stanley Sadie; 1980; 
 Salfellner, Harold (2003) Mozart and Prague. Vitalis. .

External links
 
 

Czech musicians
Czech philosophers
Czech non-fiction writers
Czech biographers
Mozart scholars
18th-century Bohemian people
19th-century Czech people
1766 births
1849 deaths
People from Sadská